Mark Russell (born 18 January 1962) is  a former Australian rules footballer who played with Sydney in the Victorian Football League (VFL).

Notes

External links 		
		
		
		
		
		
		
Living people		
1962 births		
		
Australian rules footballers from Victoria (Australia)		
Sydney Swans players
North Ballarat Football Club players
People educated at Geelong College